The following audio recordings were produced by organizations associated with Continental Singers, Inc in the United States or its successor, the Continental Global Foundation.

List of Audio Recordings

Explanatory Notes

Footnotes

References

Continental Singers